23S rRNA (adenine2503-C8)-methyltransferase (Cfr (gene)) is an enzyme with systematic name S-adenosyl-L-methionine:23S rRNA (adenine2503-C8)-methyltransferase. This enzyme catalyses the following chemical reaction

 2 S-adenosyl-L-methionine + adenine2503 in 23S rRNA  S-adenosyl-L-homocysteine + L-methionine + 5'-deoxyadenosine + 8-methyladenine2503 in 23S rRNA

This enzyme is a member of the 'AdoMet radical' (radical SAM) family.

References

External links 
 

EC 2.1.1